"Génesis" is the name given to the third studio album by the Puerto Rican singer, songwriter and actress, Mary Ann Acevedo, released on January 1, 2012 worldwide through digital download and on December 7, 2012 on compact disc. Originally the album was confirmed for release in February 2010 as "El Amor es la Solución", but with the birth of her daughter, Mary Ann had to delay the departure of the album to April 2010; then GT Musik announced the album release was delayed for a few months. She agreed that her homonymous first album was a continuation of her tenure in the third edition of "Objetivo Fama". On that album, the songs were chosen when Mary Ann left the reality show; in December she was released a special production titled Cántale a tu Bebé.

Background
This album is the comeback of Mary Ann to the music. After her pregnancy, her album of lullabies and being a contestant in the reality show Idol Puerto Rico, Mary Ann took more time to delay the album's release. It was thought that the album would be called "El Amor es la Solución" (Love is the Solution), but apparently "Genesis" proved to be a more commercial and more welcoming to the public as the first single from the CD is titled the same way. "Génesis", the official single from this album was released in March 2010, popularized by Lucecita Benítez. Mary Ann wants to convert it back into a hymn as she did Lucecita Benítez in 1969. She hopes that her fans know this song that was a success in the '70s. For Mary Ann is an honor to sing this song was an anthem of Puerto Rico through the beautiful voice of Lucecita. She has sung the theme in the concerts of "Los Favoritos". Genesis is an album that portrays the influence of Mary Ann, including covers of songs that the public has known in the voices of Rocio Durcal, Celine Dion, Mariah Carey and other singers. In addition, Mary Ann includes a new version of the song "Todo para Mi" featuring the jazz flautist Néstor Torres; song that is on her first album with the title "Todo Eres Tú." Besides, this production integrates a merengue version of the song "Mírame".

Track listing

Single
"Génesis" is the single of Mary Ann Acevedo's third album. The single released on March 16, 2010 on national radio. The song "Génesis", popularized by Lucecita Benítez in 1969. Mary Ann wants to convert it back into a hymn as he did Lucecita Benítez in 1969. She hopes that her fans know this song that was a success in the '70s. For Mary Ann is an honor to sing this song was an anthem of Puerto Rico through the beautiful voice of Lucecita. She has sung the theme in the concerts of "Los Favoritos". Mary Ann says has matured as a performer, despite her young age and said it is important that people believe what they sing.

Mary Ann said to a newspaper of Puerto Rico that she is not afraid to receive a critique of Lucecita Benítez, if she is not pleased with her new version. She said her greatest satisfaction is that "La Voz Nacional de Puerto Rico" to hear this new version of "Genesis" because she (Lucecita) has been her inspiration. Mary Ann says she's not afraid of the reaction which has Lucecita from "Genesis". "This is the perfect song for the world, the only thing that will exist is the love" "I will be honored that she heard my music", says Mary Ann. She also emphasized that "I don't consider Lucecita, will do a bad review. I think she should feel proud to be an inspiration to me". Mary Ann insisted that "God gave me the talent to sing any song" and posted to its interpretation. She stressed that the song "Genesis", composed by Guillermo Venegas Lloveras, undergo changes at the musical level, it is updated. The ballad came to the studio a month and a week after the birth of their daughter, Anna Carolina, whom he had with the merengue Guillermo Torres. In April 2010, Guillermo Torres starring producing a new TV Show, "El Show de Eddie Miro", on WIPR-TV. After that, Mary Ann record a promotional TV commercial with her song "Génesis" for the new programs seasons of WIPR.

Release history

Personnel

Vocals: Mary Ann Acevedo 
Keyboards: Martín Nieves, Guillermo Torres, Bob Benozzo
Bass: Ricardo Encarnación, Edgardo Sierra
Guitar: Jorge Laboy, Rawy Torres, George De León
Violin: Inoel Jirau, Walter Alberguini, Enrique Collazo, David Betancourt, Alexis Velázquez, Marcos Gómez, Fernando Medina
Viola: Emanuel Olivieri, María Santiago
Cello: Harry Almodovar, Gabriel Acevedo 
Drums: Carlos De León, Efrain Rodríguez

Production

Executive Producer: Ray Cruz, Guillermo Torres
Mastering: The Sound Lab (Miami, FL) 
Engineers:Carlos Velázquez, Ramón Martínez, Wilson Torres, Nestor Gonzalez
Recorded and Mixed: Ramón Martínez, Carlos Velázquez

Photography: Edwin David Cordero
Art Direction and design: Wewx Collazo (Arte Grafico &...)
Stylist: Juan Angel Pacheco
Makeup: Juan Angel Pacheco

Locations and studios
Recording locations and studios included:
 Playback Recording - (San Juan, PR)
 Altavox Studio - (Milan, Italy)
 Sonic Boutique - (Miami, FL)
 Sonoteck Studios - (San Juan, PR)

References

Mary Ann Acevedo albums
2012 albums